Potato salad is a salad dish made from boiled potatoes, usually containing a dressing and a variety of other ingredients such as boiled eggs and raw vegetables.

In the United States, it is generally considered a side dish and usually accompanies the main course.

History and varieties 
Potato salad is widely believed to have originated in Germany, spreading largely throughout Europe, the United States, and later Asia. American potato salad most likely originated from recipes brought to the U.S. by way of German and other European immigrants during the nineteenth century.

American-style potato salad is served cold or at room temperature. Ingredients often include mayonnaise or a comparable substitute (such as yogurt or sour cream), herbs, and raw vegetables (such as onion and celery). South german-style potato salad is served warm or at room temperature and is made with a vinaigrette, (rather than a creamy mayonnaise-based dressing), and typically includes bacon. North german potato salad is served cold or at room temperature. It is typically made with mayonaise, hard-boiled egg and sweet or sour pickles. The american style potato salad is likely to have originated from this version. Asian-style potato salad is similar to American-style potato salad, but has a sweeter and eggier flavor.

American potato salad 

The earliest known American potato salad recipes date back to the mid-19th century or mid-1800s and are rooted in German cuisine, which was introduced to the United States by European settlers. Early American potato salad was made from cooked potatoes that were typically dressed with oil, vinegar, and herbs.

Japanese potato salad 
A version of potato salad in Japan is known as potesara (or potesala ポテサラ), an English loanword portmanteau. It traditionally consists of the primary potato salad ingredients (mashed boiled potatoes, boiled eggs) with vegetables (cucumber, onion, carrot) and ham mixed with a dressing of mayonnaise, rice vinegar, and karashi mustard.

Russian potato salad (Oliviersalad)

Ingredients 
This kind of potato salad typically includes potatoes, mayonnaise, boiled eggs, boiled carrots and pickled cucumbers (in Polish ogórki kiszone). Sometimes canned corn, peas, boiled parsley root, boiled leek or even apples are added. Furthermore, chopped parsley is commonly used as a garnish. For seasoning the salad only salt and pepper are necessary.

See also
 List of salads
 Macaroni salad (pasta salad)
 Egg salad
 Olivier salad

References

German cuisine
British cuisine
European cuisine
Potato dishes
Independence Day (United States) foods
American salads
British salads